Manuel Enrique Jiménez Abalo (born 27 October 1956) is a Spanish retired footballer who played as a central defender.

Club career
Jiménez was born in Vilagarcía de Arousa, Province of Pontevedra, Galicia. During his professional career, he played for Sporting de Gijón and Real Burgos CF. He spent 12 of his 13 seasons with the Asturias club, appearing in nearly 500 official matches – he never played less than 30 games in La Liga, and helped the team to the fourth place in the 1986–87 campaign after contributing 43 appearances (3,870 minutes).

With Burgos, in his final season, Jiménez played all the matches and minutes, and the modest Castile and León side retained their top-division status while posting the eighth-best defensive record in the league. He retired at nearly 36, and later worked as a sports agent.

International career
Jiménez earned one cap for Spain on 18 November 1981, a 3–2 friendly win in Poland, being selected to the 1982 FIFA World Cup squad.

See also
List of La Liga players (400+ appearances)
List of Sporting de Gijón players (100+ appearances)

References

External links

1956 births
Living people
Spanish footballers
Footballers from Vilagarcía de Arousa
Association football defenders
La Liga players
Tercera División players
Sporting de Gijón B players
Sporting de Gijón players
Real Burgos CF footballers
Spain B international footballers
Spain international footballers
1982 FIFA World Cup players